Alexander Irving Simpson (July 19, 1916 – September 13, 1976) was an American football coach. He served as the head football coach at Southern Oregon College of Education—now known as Southern Oregon University—in Ashland, Oregon for five seasons, from 1946 until 1950. His coaching record at Southern Oregon was 27–16–1.

Simpson was a graduate of Southern Oregon and the University of Oregon, in the years 1937 and 1939 respectively. Prior to coaching at Southern Oregon, he had coached in high schools in Oregon, including in Ashland and Medford.

Head coaching record

Football

References

External links
 

1916 births
1976 deaths
Southern Oregon Raiders football coaches
Southern Oregon Raiders men's basketball coaches
High school football coaches in Oregon
Southern Oregon University alumni
University of Oregon alumni
Sportspeople from Eureka, California